John Joseph Tinker (15 January 187530 July 1957) was a British Labour Party politician.

Born in Little Hulton, Tinker began working at a coal mine at the age of ten.  He became active in the Lancashire and Cheshire Miners' Federation, and became the union's full-time agent for the St Helens area in 1915.

Tinker was a supporter of the Labour Party, for which he was elected to St Helens Town Council in 1919.  He was elected at the 1923 general election as Member of Parliament (MP) for Leigh in Lancashire with the support of the Miners' Federation of Great Britain, and held the seat until his retirement from the House of Commons at the 1945 general election.

During his 22 years in the House of Commons, Joseph Tinker ensured that the safety of coal miners and their welfare became a key issue discussed, debated and acted upon. Against considerable opposition, he ensured that the dreadful working conditions of miners were improved.

Joseph Tinker also introduced the first legislation which brought equal funding to Catholic schools in the UK.

References

External links 

1875 births
1957 deaths
Labour Party (UK) MPs for English constituencies
Miners' Federation of Great Britain-sponsored MPs
UK MPs 1923–1924
UK MPs 1924–1929
UK MPs 1929–1931
UK MPs 1931–1935
UK MPs 1935–1945
Members of the Parliament of the United Kingdom for Leigh